Obren Joksimović (15 May 1952 – 13 March 2021) was a Serbian surgeon and politician who served as Minister of Health in the Government of Serbia from 25 January 2001 to 22 October 2001.

Biography 
Joksimović was born on 15 May 1952 to a Bosnian Serb family in Očevlje, at that time part of PR Bosnia and Herzegovina and FPR Yugoslavia.

He graduated in 1979 at the Faculty of Medicine, University of Belgrade, and specialized in general surgery in 1988.

During the Bosnian War, he participated as a volunteer on numerous battlefields as a war surgeon of the Army of Republika Srpska and at the same time he was a member of the Federal Assembly of FR Yugoslavia as a member of the Serbian Renewal Movement (since 1992). In 1995, angry and dissatisfied, Joksimović resigned from the parliament and joined the Democratic Party of Serbia together with several other party colleagues.

He was appointed the Minister of Health in the cabinet of Zoran Đinđić and the Government of Serbia on 25 January 2001 and served until 22 October 2001.

In September 2004, he defended his doctoral dissertation at Megatrend University, Faculty of Management in Zaječar (whose teacher he became immediately afterwards).

He was the leader of Democratic Community of Serbia, which emerged from the Democratic Party of Serbia and merged into Serbian Radical Party.

Joksimović died from COVID-19 on 13 March 2021, in Belgrade at the age of 68.

References

1952 births
2021 deaths
People from Breza, Bosnia and Herzegovina
Serbs of Bosnia and Herzegovina
Democratic Party of Serbia politicians
Serbian Radical Party politicians
Serbian surgeons
Government ministers of Serbia
Serbian Renewal Movement politicians
Deaths from the COVID-19 pandemic in Serbia